The 491st Fighter-Bomber Squadron is an inactive United States Air Force unit.  Its last assignment was with the 84th Fighter Group at Harding Field, Louisiana, where it was inactivated on 1 April 1944.

History
The squadron was first activated at Hunter Field, Georgia in February 1942 as one of the four original squadrons of the 84th Bombardment Group.  The squadron was briefly equipped with the Vultee V-72 Vengeance, but after experimenting with that unsuccessful aircraft, re-equipped with the Douglas A-24 Banshee 
The squadron acted as an operational and replacement training unit from late 1942 until disbanding in 1944.

Lineage
 Constituted as the  304th Bombardment Squadron (Light) on 13 January 1942
 Activated on 10 February 1942
 Redesignated 491st Fighter-Bomber Squadron on 10 August 1943
 Disbanded on 1 April 1944

Assignments
 84th Bombardment Group (later 84th Fighter-Bomber Group), 10 February 1942 – 1 April 1944

Stations
 Hunter Field, Georgia, 10 February 1942
 Drew Field, Florida, 8 February 1943
 Harding Field, Louisiana, 4 October 1943 – 1 April 1944

Aircraft
 Vultee V-72 Vengeance, 1942
 Douglas A-24 Banshee, 1942–1943
 Bell P-39 Airacobra, 1943
 Republic P-47 Thunderbolt, 1943–1944.

References

Notes

Bibliography

 
 

Fighter squadrons of the United States Army Air Forces
Military units and formations disestablished in 1944